Maehwasan is a South Korean mountain between Hoengseong County and Wonju, Gangwon-do.

See also
 List of mountains in Korea
 Battle of Maehwa-san

Notes

References
 

Mountains of South Korea
Mountains of Gangwon Province, South Korea
One-thousanders of South Korea